Groupe Radio Simard is a Canadian radio broadcasting company, which owns seven radio stations in the Bas-Saint-Laurent and Chaudière-Appalaches regions of Quebec. The company's headquarters is in Rivière-du-Loup.

Stations
 La Pocatière - CHOX-FM
 Montmagny - CIQI-FM 
 Rimouski - CFYX-FM 
 Rivière-du-Loup - CIBM-FM, CIEL-FM
 Saint-Georges - CHJM-FM, CKRB-FM
 Trois-Pistoles - CIEL-FM-4

External links
 Groupe Radio Simard

Radio broadcasting companies of Canada
Companies based in Quebec
Rivière-du-Loup